Jeon Woo-Keun (born 25 February 1977) is a former South Korean footballer who played as a midfielder.

His previous clubs are Busan I'Park,  Gwangju Sangmu Bulsajo in the South Korean K-League, Dalian Shide in the Chinese Super League and Home United FC in Liga Primer Indonesia.

External links 
 

1977 births
Living people
South Korean footballers
South Korean expatriate footballers
Association football defenders
Busan IPark players
Gimcheon Sangmu FC players
Dalian Shide F.C. players
Home United FC players
K League 1 players
Singapore Premier League players
Chinese Super League players
Expatriate footballers in China
South Korean expatriate sportspeople in China
Expatriate footballers in Singapore
South Korean expatriate sportspeople in Singapore
Association football midfielders